Uppara Girinath (born 9 October 1998) is an Indian cricketer. He made his first-class debut on 27 January 2020, for Andhra in the 2019–20 Ranji Trophy.

References

External links
 

1998 births
Living people
Indian cricketers
Andhra cricketers
Place of birth missing (living people)